Rosalba bucki is a species of beetle in the family Cerambycidae. It was described by Melzer in 1934. It is known from Brazil.

References

Rosalba (beetle)
Beetles described in 1934